The Saratoga Breeders' Cup Handicap was a Grade II Thoroughbred race for horses three-years-old and up run on dirt at Saratoga Race Course in New York from 1994 through 2005. From 1994 through 1996, it was run as the Saratoga Cup Handicap, the name of another race that was run from 1865 through 1955.

A Grade II event, it was set at a distance of 1 1/8 miles for its inaugural running but changed in 1995 to 1 1/4 miles. It offered a purse of $250,000.

Records
Speed record:
 2:00.83 @ 1¼ miles - Evening Attire (2004)

Most wins:
 2 - L'Carriere (1995, 1996)
 2 - Evening Attire (2002, 2004)

Most wins by a jockey:
 3 - Jorge Chavez (1996, 2000, 2003)

Most wins by a trainer:
 3 - H. James Bond (1995, 1996, 2000) 

Most wins by an owner:
 2 - Virginia Kraft Payson (1995, 1996)
 2 - Joseph & Mary Grant, Tommy J. Kelly

Winners

See also
New York Racing Association

References

Graded stakes races in the United States
Discontinued horse races in New York (state)
Saratoga Race Course
Recurring sporting events established in 1994
Recurring sporting events disestablished in 2005
1994 establishments in New York (state)
2005 disestablishments in New York (state)